A24 is an American independent entertainment company that specializes in film and television production, as well as film distribution. The company is based in Manhattan, New York City.

A24 was founded as A24 Films in 2012 by Daniel Katz, David Fenkel, and John Hodges. Its first film, A Glimpse Inside the Mind of Charles Swan III, was released on February 8, 2013. That same year, the company gained recognition with their North American release of Spring Breakers. A24 subsequently became widely known for distributing and producing critically acclaimed films, such as The Spectacular Now (2013), Ex Machina (2014), Room (2015), Moonlight (2016), Lady Bird (2017), Eighth Grade (2018), Uncut Gems (2019), Minari (2020), C'mon C'mon (2021), and Everything Everywhere All at Once (2022). As of 2023, Lady Bird and Eighth Grade are A24's highest-rated films on Rotten Tomatoes, with a 99% approval rating for each. Additionally, A24 has worked with several high-profile filmmakers, such as Ari Aster, Sean Baker, Noah Baumbach, Bo Burnham, Sofia Coppola, the Daniels, Claire Denis, Robert Eggers, Alex Garland, Greta Gerwig, Joanna Hogg, Barry Jenkins, Yorgos Lanthimos, Sam Levinson, David Lowery, Kelly Reichardt, the Safdie brothers, Lulu Wang and Ti West.

The company changed its name to A24 in 2016, and entered co-distribution deals with Apple TV+, DirecTV Cinema and Showtime Networks, and formerly Amazon Prime.

A24 earned its first Academy Award for Best Picture accolade for Moonlight in 2017 and again with Everything Everywhere All at Once in 2023, which became the studio's highest-grossing film; with the latter's numerous accolades, combined with one for another A24 film (The Whale), A24 became the first studio to win for all six major categories of the Academy Awards in a single year, as well as the most awarded film of all time. As of 2023, A24 has received a total of 49 Academy Award nominations, winning 16 overall.

The company also established its own television division, producing notable works, such as The Carmichael Show, Euphoria, Irma Vep and Ramy.

History

2012–2013: Founding and early years
A24 was founded on August 20, 2012, by film veterans Daniel Katz, David Fenkel, and John Hodges. Katz formerly led the film finance group at Guggenheim Partners, Fenkel was the president, co-founder and partner at Oscilloscope, and Hodges served as Head of Production and Development at Big Beach. The name "A24" was inspired by the Italian A24 motorway Katz was driving on when he decided to found the company; coincidentally, the motorway is also renowned in Italian film history as the setting of many small Abruzzan towns and rural landscapes employed in the films of neorealist and surrealist masters.

Guggenheim Partners provided the seed money for A24. The company was started to share "movies from a distinctive point of view". In October 2012, Nicolette Aizenberg joined as head of publicity from 42West where she was senior publicity executive.

The company began its distribution of films in 2013. The company's first theatrical release was Roman Coppola's A Glimpse Inside the Mind of Charles Swan III, which had a limited theatrical release. Other 2013 theatrical releases included Sally Potter's Ginger & Rosa, Harmony Korine's Spring Breakers, Sofia Coppola's The Bling Ring, and James Ponsoldt's The Spectacular Now. In September 2013, A24 entered a $40 million deal with DirecTV Cinema, where DirecTV Cinema would offer day-and-date releases 30 days prior to a theatrical release by A24; Enemy was the first film to be distributed under the deal. In the same year, A24 entered a deal with Amazon Prime; A24-distributed films would be available on Amazon Prime Video after becoming available on Blu-ray and DVD.

2014–2017: Television and later productions
In May 2015, A24 announced that it would start a television division and began producing the USA Network series Playing House, as well as working to develop a television series that would later become Comrade Detective, produced by Channing Tatum. The company also announced that they would also finance and develop pilots.

In January 2016, Sasha Lloyd joined the company to handle all film, television distribution, and business development in the international marketplace. The company, with cooperation from Bank of America, J.P. Morgan & Co. and SunTrust Banks, also raised its line of credit from $50 million to $125 million a month later to build upon its operations. In April 2016, the company acquired all foreign rights to Swiss Army Man, distributing the film in all territories, and partnering with distributors who previously acquired rights to the film, a first for the company. In June, the company, along with Oscilloscope and distributor Honora, joined BitTorrent Now to distribute the work of their portfolio across the ad-supported service.

In January 2017, the company acquired the United States and Chinese distribution rights for their first foreign language film, Menashe.

2018–present: Management changes and partnerships
On February 20, 2018, A24 launched a podcast titled "The A24 Podcast". Episodes are based around a discussion between two members of the film industry. Notable guests on the show have included Bo Burnham, Sofia Coppola, Alia Shawkat, Paul Schrader, and Martin Scorsese. Despite lacking any pre-defined structure, episodes generally contain discussions around recent works of the two guests, allowing for branching discussions to other areas. , twenty-seven episodes had been released.

On March 26, 2018, co-founder John Hodges announced that he was exiting the company.

On November 15, 2018, A24 and Apple announced that they had entered into a multi-year partnership where A24 will produce a slate of original films for Apple. This was not a first-look deal, meaning that A24 can continue to produce and acquire films to release outside of the deal, and that it would not affect previous deals that A24 had signed with other companies. It is unknown if the slate of films will have a theatrical release or be exclusive to Apple's Apple TV+ streaming service.

On November 13, 2019, A24 entered into a premium cable television broadcast deal with Showtime Networks which covered all film releases through November 1, 2022. The deal excluded films that are already part of the Apple partnership.

In July 2021, A24 reportedly explored a possible buyout for between $2.5 billion to $3 billion.

At the 95th Academy Awards, A24 became the first independent studio to sweep Best Picture, Best Director, and all four acting categories in a single year.

In 2023, the company bought distribution rights to two older films released before the company's inception, starting with Darren Aronofsky's Pi (1998) and Jonathan Demme's Stop Making Sense (1984), both of which are remastered versions.

Accolades
In 2016, films distributed by A24 won Academy Awards for Best Actress (Brie Larson for Room), Best Documentary Feature (Amy), and Best Visual Effects (Ex Machina).

In 2017, Moonlight won the Academy Award for Best Picture (the first such award for the company), Best Adapted Screenplay (Barry Jenkins and Tarell Alvin McCraney), and Best Supporting Actor (Mahershala Ali).

In 2021, A24 won the Academy Award for Best Supporting Actress (Yuh-jung Youn for Minari, who became the first Korean actress to win an Oscar for acting).

In 2023, A24 became the most nominated single studio of that year's ceremony with 18 total nominations between six of their films; Everything Everywhere All at Once (11 nominations; the most nominated film that year, including Best Picture), The Whale (3 nominations), and Aftersun, Causeway, Close and Marcel the Shell with Shoes On (each with 1 nomination). A24 would ultimately become the most awarded studio that year with nine awards in total, as well as sweeping seven of the major awards (including all four acting categories); Everything Everywhere All at Once won seven—Best Picture, Best Director (Daniel Kwan and Daniel Scheinert), Best Actress (Michelle Yeoh), Best Supporting Actor (Ke Huy Quan), Best Supporting Actress (Jamie Lee Curtis), Best Original Screenplay (Daniel Kwan and Daniel Scheinert), and Best Film Editing (Paul Rogers)—while The Whale won two—Best Actor (Brendan Fraser) and Best Makeup and Hairstyling (Adrien Morot, Judy Chin, and Anne Marie Bradley).

A24 has also been nominated and won numerous British Academy Film Awards, Critics' Choice Awards, Golden Globe Awards, Independent Spirit Awards, and Screen Actors Guild Awards.

Filmography

A24 produces and distributes 18 to 20 films a year. Its five highest grossing films are Everything Everywhere All at Once ($107.2 million), Hereditary ($82.5 million), Lady Bird ($79 million), Moonlight ($65.3 million), and Uncut Gems ($50 million).

See also

 Amazon Studios
 Annapurna Pictures
 Bleecker Street
 Blumhouse Productions
 Drafthouse Films
 IFC Films
 Neon
 The Picture Company
 Roadside Attractions
 Sony Pictures Classics
 STX Entertainment
 Vertical Entertainment

References
Informational notes

Citations

External links
 

Companies based in Manhattan
American independent film studios
2012 establishments in New York City
American companies established in 2012
Film distributors of the United States
Entertainment companies established in 2012
Entertainment companies based in New York City
Film production companies of the United States